Lawgiver may refer to:

A person who draws up, introduces, or enacts a code of laws for a nation or people, such as:
Culture hero, a type of mythological figure
Legislator, a person who writes and passes laws
The Lawgiver, a 2012 novel relating to Moses, by Herman Wouk.
Lawgiver (Judge Dredd), a fictional gun from the Judge Dredd comics and films
The Lawgiver, a Planet of the Apes character

See also
Great man theory
Draco (lawgiver)
Lycurgus of Sparta
Numa Pompilius
Moses